Rebecca Stokell (born 13 March 2000) is an Irish cricketer. She made her Women's One Day International cricket (WODI) debut against South Africa in the 2017 South Africa Quadrangular Series on 11 May 2017. She plays in the Women's Super Series for Typhoons.

In June 2018, she was named in Ireland's squad for the 2018 ICC Women's World Twenty20 Qualifier tournament. In October 2018, she was named in Ireland's squad for the 2018 ICC Women's World Twenty20 tournament in the West Indies. The following month, she was named the Female Academy Player of the Year at the annual Cricket Ireland Awards.

In May 2019, she was named in Ireland's Women's Twenty20 International (WT20I) squad for their series against the West Indies. She made her WT20I debut for Ireland against the West Indies on 26 May 2019.

In August 2019, she was named in Ireland's squad for the 2019 ICC Women's World Twenty20 Qualifier tournament in Scotland. In July 2020, she was awarded a non-retainer contract by Cricket Ireland for the following year. In November 2021, she was named in Ireland's team for the 2021 Women's Cricket World Cup Qualifier tournament in Zimbabwe.

References

External links
 
 

2000 births
Living people
Cricketers from Dublin (city)
Irish women cricketers
Ireland women One Day International cricketers
Ireland women Twenty20 International cricketers
Dragons (women's cricket) cricketers
Scorchers (women's cricket) cricketers
Typhoons (women's cricket) cricketers